Daniel Majic, or Danny Majic is a Croatian American record producer based in Los Angeles, CA. Majic has produced and written songs for G-Eazy, OneRepublic, Eminem 2 Chainz, Lecrae, Calum Scott, Galantis, A Boogie wit da Hoodie, Galantis, David Guetta, Flo Rida, The Vamps and Ally Brooke.

Production Discography

References

1990 births
Living people
Record producers from California
Songwriters from California
People from Los Angeles